Stjepan Božić (born October 23, 1974 in Brežice, Slovenia) is a Croatian super middleweight boxer.
He won the title of World Boxing Foundation (WBFo) world champion on June 6, 2005 fighting against Australian Nader Hamdan. He successfully defended the title on December 2 in the same year versus Argentinian Julio Vasquez.

He won the WBA intercontinental title versus  Danish Lolenga Mock.  After several defenses of the WBA intercontinental title, Božić landed a shot at the WBA world title, losing to Dimitri Sartison by sixth round TKO.

Personal life
Stjepan married Angelina in 2005 and they had two children together, Dominik and Matej.
In April 2010 Stjepan announced that he was getting divorced.

Professional boxing record

| style="text-align:center;" colspan="8"|29 Wins (19 knockouts, 10 decisions), 11 Losses (8 knockouts, 3 decisions), 0 Draws
|-  style="text-align:center; background:#e3e3e3;"
|  style="border-style:none none solid solid; "|Res.
|  style="border-style:none none solid solid; "|Record
|  style="border-style:none none solid solid; "|Opponent
|  style="border-style:none none solid solid; "|Type
|  style="border-style:none none solid solid; "|Round
|  style="border-style:none none solid solid; "|Date
|  style="border-style:none none solid solid; "|Location
|  style="border-style:none none solid solid; "|Notes
|-align=center
|- align=center
|Loss
|align=center|29–11||align=left|  Michal Gerlecki 
|
|
|
|align=left|
|align=left|  
|-
|- align=center
|Loss
|align=center|29–10||align=left| Marek Matyja
|
|
|
|align=left|
|align=left|  
|- align=center
|- align=center
|Loss
|align=center|29–9||align=left|  Tyron Zeuge
|
|
|
|align=left|
|align=left|  For IBF International super middleweight title
|- align=center
|- align=center
|Win
|align=center|29–8||align=left|  Miroslav Kvocka
|
|
|
|align=left|
|align=left|  
|- align=center
|- align=center
|Loss
|align=center|28–8||align=left| Fedor Chudinov
|
|
|
|align=left|
|align=left|  For vacant WBC CIS and Slovenian Boxing Bureau (CISBB) super middleweight title
|- align=center
|- align=center
|Win
|align=center|28–7||align=left|  Paata Varduashvili 
|
|
|
|align=left|
|align=left|  
|- align=center
|- align=center
|Win
|align=center|27–7||align=left| Edo Čavrk
|
|
|
|align=left|
|align=left|  
|- align=center
|- align=center
|Loss
|align=center|26–7||align=left| James DeGale
|
|
|
|align=left|
|align=left|  For WBC Silver super middleweight title
|- align=center
|- align=center
|Win
|align=center|26–6||align=left| Gordan Glišić
|
|
|
|align=left|
|align=left|
|- align=center
|- align=center
|Win
|align=center|25–6||align=left| Miša Nikolić
|
|
|
|align=left|
|align=left|
|- align=center
|Loss
|align=center|24–6||align=left| Henry Weber
|
|
|
|align=left|
|align=left| 
|- align=center
|Loss
|align=center|24–5||align=left| Arthur Abraham 
|
|
|
|align=left|
|align=left|
|- align=center
|Win
|align=center|24–4||align=left| Gyula Gaspar
|
|
|
|align=left|
|align=left|
|- align=center
|Loss
|align=center|23–4||align=left| Dimitri Sartison
|
|
|
|align=left|
|align=left| For vacant WBA World super middleweight title
|- align=center
|Win
|align=center|23–3||align=left| Joseph Sovijus
|
|
|
|align=left|
|align=left|
|- align=center
|Win
|align=center|22–3||align=left| Roman Aramian 
|
|
|
|align=left|
|align=left| Retained WBA Inter-Continental super middleweight title
|- align=center
|Win
|align=center|21–3||align=left| Djamel Selini
|
|
|
|align=left|
|align=left|  Retained WBA Inter-Continental super middleweight title
|- align=center
|Win
|align=center|20–3||align=left| Lolenga Mock
|
|
|
|align=left|
|align=left| Won vacant WBA Inter-Continental super middleweight title
|- align=center
|Win
|align=center|19–3||align=left| Stefan Stanko
|
|
|
|align=left|
|align=left| 
|- align=center
|Loss
|align=center|18–3||align=left| Vitaliy Tsypko
|
|
|
|align=left|
|align=left| 
|- align=center
|Loss
|align=center|18–2||align=left| David Gogiya
|
|
|
|align=left|
|align=left|
|- align=center
|Win
|align=center|18–1||align=left| Julio César Vásquez
|
|
|
|align=left|
|align=left|Retained World Boxing Foundation super middleweight title
|- align=center
|Win
|align=center|17–1||align=left| Nader Hamdan
|
|
|
|align=left|
|align=left|Won vacant World Boxing Foundation super middleweight title
|- align=center
|Win
|align=center|16–1||align=left| Octavian Stoica
|
|
|
|align=left|
|align=left|
|- align=center
|Win
|align=center|15–1||align=left| Wilfried Visee Rivelli
|
|
|
|align=left|
|align=left|
|- align=center
|Win
|align=center|14–1||align=left| Eliseo Nogueira 
|
|
|
|align=left|
|align=left|
|- align=center
|Win
|align=center|13–1||align=left| Karim Bennama
|
|
|
|align=left|
|align=left|
|- align=center
|Win
|align=center|12–1||align=left| Eliseo Nogueira 
|
|
|
|align=left|
|align=left|
|- align=center
|Win
|align=center|11–1||align=left| Andras Lukats
|
|
|
|align=left|
|align=left|
|- align=center
|Win
|align=center|10–1||align=left|  Youssef Temsoury 
|
|
|
|align=left|
|align=left|
|- align=center
|Win
|align=center|9–1||align=left| Stefan Stanko
|
|
|
|align=left|
|align=left|
|- align=center
|Win
|align=center|8–1||align=left| Morahir Babayan 
|
|
|
|align=left|
|align=left|
|- align=center
|Win
|align=center|7–1||align=left| Milojko Pivljanin
|
|
|
|align=left|
|align=left|
|- align=center
|Loss
|align=center|6–1||align=left| Aime Bafounta
|
|
|
|align=left|
|align=left|
|- align=center
|Win
|align=center|6–0||align=left|  Ricardo Simarra 
|
|
|
|align=left|
|align=left|
|- align=center
|Win
|align=center|5–0||align=left| Stefan Stanko
|
|
|
|align=left|
|align=left|
|- align=center
|Win
|align=center|4–0||align=left| Giovanni Jemma
|
|
|
|align=left|
|align=left|
|- align=center
|Win
|align=center|3–0||align=left| Karim Gherbi 
|
|
|
|align=left|
|align=left|
|- align=center
|Win
|align=center|2–0||align=left| Miloud Chinoun  
|
|
|
|align=left|
|align=left|
|- align=center
|Win
|align=center|1–0||align=left| Tibor Horvath  
|
|
|
|align=left|
|align=left| 
|- align=center

References

Living people
1974 births
People from Brežice
Croatian male boxers
Super-middleweight boxers